Ameyama Dam (雨山ダム) is a gravity dam located in Aichi Prefecture in Japan. The dam is used for flood control and water supply. The catchment area of the dam is 2.6 km2. The dam impounds about 4  ha of land when full and can store 251 thousand cubic meters of water. The construction of the dam was started on 1989 and completed in 1995.

References

Dams in Aichi Prefecture
1995 establishments in Japan